Dance with a Stranger is a Norwegian rock band from Kristiansund.

Biography 
The band was founded in Bergen 1984 and had great success until they parted in 1994. Since then they have had a few reunion concerts, as well as releasing compilation CDs. In 2013 bassist Yngve Moe died in an accident. The band still completed their farewell tour in 2014, now joined by Per Mathisen on bass.

Discography
Dance with a Stranger (1987)
To (1989)
Atmosphere (1991)
Look What You've Done (1994)
Unplugged (1994)
The Best of Dance with a Stranger (1995)
Happy Sounds (1998)
''Everyone Needs a Friend... The Very Best Of ( 2007)

Members
Present members
Frode Alnæs  – guitar, vocals
Øivind "Elg" Elgenes  – vocals
Per Mathisen  – bass (2014)
Bjørn Jenssen  – drums 

Former member
Yngve Moe  – bass (1983–1994; died 2013)

Sources
Pop-lexicon (Norwegian)
About Dance with a Stranger at the music guide Groove.no (Norwegian)
Website

References

External links 
Dance with a Stranger-bassist døde on NRK (in Norwegian)
Dance With A Stranger - Live 1991 - The Invisible Man at Royal Albert Hall on YouTube
"DANCE WITH A STRANGER" Boys & Girls, African road, Looking for love, Living in the future on YouTube
Dance With a Stranger 2014 Per Mathisen Bass Solo, Frode Alnæs on YouTube

Norwegian musical groups